The Good Guys is an American situation comedy that aired on CBS from September 25, 1968, to January 23, 1970. Forty-two color episodes were filmed. The program was produced by Talent Associates.

Although some episodes, including the pilot, have been posted online in colour and black and white, the full series has never been released on home media or rebroadcast in decades, and a majority of the show remains unseen.

Synopsis

The main characters are Rufus Butterworth (Bob Denver), the driver of a customized 1924 Lincoln turned taxi, and his childhood friend Bert Gramus, played by Herb Edelman, owner of a local diner and neighborhood hangout called "Bert's Place", which Butterworth advertised on the taxi's fender-mount spare tire covers. Plots usually revolved around "get rich quick" schemes that invariably backfired.  In the second season (1969–1970), Rufus gave up driving the cab and became a partner with Bert in the diner, which moved to a beach location. Other characters included Bert's schoolteacher wife, Claudia (Joyce Van Patten), and diner regulars Mr. Bender, Hal Dawson, and truck driver Big Tom (played by Denver's Gilligan's Island co-star Alan Hale Jr.).

Never a hit with viewers, The Good Guys failed to finish in the Nielsen Top 30 and was canceled during its second season.

Production notes
Rufus's taxi was created by George Barris.  A 1/25-scale model kit was manufactured by MPC Corporation and examples are highly collectable today.

The first several episodes of the first season were filmed before a live studio audience (unusual at the time), with an accompanying laugh track to sweeten the laughs during post-production. Due to production changes, the majority of Season One episodes and all of Season Two were filmed without a studio audience. Episodes were fitted with a laugh track afterwards.

Denver later recalled of the show's negative reception: "I still had some animus at how CBS threw us in the dumper. Herb Edelman and I'd done The Good Guys…but sour critics said it should have been just called 'Guys'."

Syndication
The Good Guys has never been shown in reruns in the United States. In his autobiography, Gilligan, Maynard and Me, Bob Denver related that poor-quality prints of the show were shown for a time in South America. TV Land considered showing episodes of the show in 1998 but opted instead to air episodes of another "lost" sitcom that was also produced by Talent Associates, He & She.

Episodes
Sources

Season 1 (1968–1969)

Season 2 (1969–1970)

References

External links

 

1968 American television series debuts
1970 American television series endings
1960s American sitcoms
1970s American sitcoms
1960s American workplace comedy television series
1970s American workplace comedy television series
CBS original programming
Television series by Talent Associates
Television series set in restaurants